Physaria kingii is a species of flowering plant in the family Brassicaceae known by the common name King bladderpod. It is native to western North America from Utah to Baja California, where it grows in dry and rocky habitat, such as deserts and adjacent mountain slopes. This is a perennial herb growing a small, hairy stem from a caudex. The leaves form a patch or rosette around the caudex, each up to 6 centimeters long and round, oval, diamond, or spoonlike in shape. The inflorescence is an erect or mostly upright raceme of bright yellow mustardlike flowers. The fruit is a hairy capsule under a centimeter long suspended on a short, often curvy pedicel.

There are three subspecies. One, the San Bernardino Mountains bladderpod (subsp. bernardina), is a very rare plant known from only a few spots near Big Bear in the San Bernardino Mountains of southern California. Because of threats to the plant from mining and other human activities, this subspecies is treated as an endangered species on the federal level.

References

External links
Calflora Database: Physaria kingii (King's bladderpod)
Jepson Manual eFlora treatment of Physaria kingii
USDA Plants Profile for Physaria kingii (King's bladderpod)
UC CalPhotos gallery of Physaria kingii

kingii
Flora of California
Flora of Baja California
Flora of Nevada
Flora of the Great Basin
Flora of the California desert regions
Natural history of the Mojave Desert
Natural history of the Transverse Ranges
Taxa named by Sereno Watson